Terry Kelly, CM (born 1955) is a Canadian country/folk music artist, athlete and professional speaker. Kelly has released six studio albums and charted eleven singles on the RPM Canadian country singles chart. In addition to award nominations from the Juno Awards and the Canadian Country Music Association, Kelly has also won seven East Coast Music Awards. In 2003, Kelly was inducted into the Order of Canada, the highest civilian honour within the Canadian system of honours. He sang the Canadian National Anthem at the Opening Ceremonies for the 2010 Winter Paralympics in Vancouver and also sang at the official installation ceremony of the 28th Governor General of Canada (David Lloyd Johnston) in 2010.

Biography
At the age of one, Kelly was diagnosed with retinoblastoma, a cancerous condition that left him blind. As a child, he had both of his eyes removed. His parents sent him to the Halifax School for the Blind when he was seven. His recording career began in high school when he released five albums with instrumental band The Stringbusters.

At the Canadian Track Championships, Kelly won Silver (2nd place) in 1979 and once more in 1980. He became the third blind person in the world to run a sub five-minute mile. He competed in the 1980 Paralympics in Arnhem, Netherlands and carried the Olympic torch as part of the cross Canada Torch Relay.

Kelly released his first studio album, On the Move, in 1985. His second album, Face to Face, was released in 1988. "In My Father's House," the first single from Kelly's third studio album, 1992's Divided Highway, was nominated for Single and SOCAN Song of the Year at the 1993 Canadian Country Music Association Awards. The same year, Kelly set an East Coast Music Awards record when he won every award that he was nominated for, including Album of the Year (Divided Highway), SOCAN Song of the Year (In My Father's House), Male Vocalist of the Year, Country Artist of the Year and Entertainer of the Year. He was also nominated for a 1995 Juno Award for Best Country Male Vocalist. A fourth album, Far Cry from Leaving, followed in 1997.

In 2000, Kelly was presented with the King Clancy Award. The following year, Kelly received an Honorary Doctorate of Civil Laws from the University of King's College. He also received an Honorary Doctorate of Fine Arts from Saint Mary's University in 2002. Kelly's 2002 album, The Power of the Dream was the first music CD in the world with Braille liner notes. In 2003, Kelly was appointed to the Order of Canada.

Kelly released his first Christmas album, Old Tyme Christmas, in 2004. In 2005, he was presented with the Humanitarian Award from the Canadian Country Music Association.  Kelly travelled to Afghanistan in 2007 to perform for Canadian troops. In 2016, Kelly was inducted into the Canadian Disability Hall of Fame.

A Pittance of Time

Kelly's most recent single, "A Pittance of Time", was released in 2003. The song inspired a musical production, Two Minutes of Silence - A Pittance of Time. The song was motivated by an interaction Kelly observed at a drug store on November 11, 1999.

Discography

Albums

Singles

References

External links
 Terry Kelly - Encyclopedia of Newfoundland and Labrador v. 3, p. 163-4

Blind musicians
Canadian folk singer-songwriters
Canadian male singer-songwriters
Canadian country singer-songwriters
Living people
Members of the Order of Canada
Canadian blind people
Musicians from St. John's, Newfoundland and Labrador
1955 births
Canadian Disability Hall of Fame
GUN Records artists
Blind singers